North Clarion County School District is located in Clarion County, Pennsylvania. It consists of the North Clarion County Elementary School with pre-kindergarten through grade 6 and the North Clarion County Junior/Senior High School serving students in grades 7 through 12.

School districts in Clarion County, Pennsylvania